"Mom" is a song recorded by Welsh singer Bonnie Tyler for her album Rocks and Honey (2013). Country superstar Garth Brooks covered the song on his 2014 album Man Against Machine.

Background
Bonnie Tyler first heard the song being performed at a session in the Bluebird Cafe, Nashville, Tennessee. She selected the song to appear on Rocks and Honey.

Critical reception
Carys Jones from Entertainment Focus described "Mom" as "a beautifully written song."

Garth Brooks version

Garth Brooks covered the song on his 2014 album Man Against Machine. He performed it live on Good Morning America in November 2014, receiving a great deal of media attention in promotion of his album. It was released as the album's second single on November 24, 2014, available for digital download exclusively through Brooks' online music store, GhostTunes.

Chart performance

Other versions
A version by The Nashville Nuggets debuted at number 46 on the Billboard Hot Country Songs chart for the week of December 13, 2014. The Nashville Nuggets is a recording name of Wynn Varble and Don Sampson, the song's writers.

References

Bonnie Tyler songs
2013 songs
2014 singles
Garth Brooks songs
RCA Records Nashville singles
Songs written by Wynn Varble
Songs written by Don Sampson
Songs about mothers